Rabbi Daniel Fridman שליט"א is an Orthodox Jew who is the S'gan (Deputy) Rosh Yeshiva of TABC and the Rabbi of the Jewish Center of Teaneck.

Biography 
Rabbi Daniel Fridman שליט"א grew up in Teaneck, New Jersey, where he attended Yavneh Academy for elementary school. Following Yavneh Academy, he attended the Frisch School, graduating in 2002. After high school, he attended Yeshivat Har Etzion. After attending Yeshivat Har Etzion, Rabbi Fridman attended Columbia University, where he majored in Biological Sciences. Rabbi Daniel Fridman was a Talmid of Rabbi Michael Rosensweig at RIETS. Before living in Teaneck, Rabbi Fridman lived on the Upper West Side of New York City, where he served as the Resident Scholar of the Jewish Center of Manhattan. He also teaches at Lamdeinu, a learning program for adults based in Teaneck's Congregation Beth Aaron. He is planning to complete Yadin Yadin Semicha at RIETS and a Master’s Degree in Jewish Philosophy at the Bernard Revel Graduate School of Jewish Studies at YU.

Early life
Rabbi Fridman שליט"א was born in the Bronx; his parents, Drs. Esther and Morton Fridman, both psychiatrists, were residents at the Albert Einstein College of Medicine there. In 1988, his parents moved their young family — Daniel was 3, and his older brother, Ari, was 4 — to Teaneck.

Personal 
Rabbi Daniel Fridman שליט"א was raised in Teaneck, NJ, as was his wife, Dr. Chaya Gopin who is an Assistant Clinical Professor of Neuropsychology at Weill Cornell Medical College. Daniel and Chaya have a daughter Eliana and two sons; Yosef Reuven (Joey) David and Benji.

References 

Living people
American Modern Orthodox rabbis
Frisch School alumni
People from Teaneck, New Jersey
Rabbi Isaac Elchanan Theological Seminary semikhah recipients
Year of birth missing (living people)
21st-century American Jews
Orthodox rabbis
Yeshivat Har Etzion